Sarah Jane "Salty" Ferguson (née Sands; born July 27, 1935) is a former right fielder and catcher who played from  through  in the All-American Girls Professional Baseball League.

Summary

Playing career
The AAGPBL was founded in 1943 by Philip K. Wrigley, who was in charge both of the Wrigley Company and the Chicago Cubs Major League Baseball club. Wrigley decided to create the league as a promotional sideline to maintain interest in baseball. By then, the military draft was depleting Major League rosters of first-line players and attendance declined at ballparks around the country. Arthur Meyerhoff, Wrigley's advertising director, was given the responsibility of coordinating operations. The AAGPBL lasted twelve successful seasons before folding in 1954, when other interests and forms of recreation began to claim the attention of sport fanatics. The circuit was owned by Wrigley only from 1943 to 1945, and by Meyerhoff from 1945 to 1951. The clubs were then individually owned from 1951 to 1954.

A native of Orangeville, Pennsylvania, Sands had her first contact with baseball at the age of four when her father took her to a ball game. She grew up playing sandlot ball with neighborhood kids, most of them boys, at an early age, but did not start participating in organized baseball until she was 14. At this time, she became the proud batgirl of the 1949 Orangeville semi-professional baseball team. When I became the batgirl the wife of one of the players took one of the men's uniforms and cut it down to fit me, Sands recalled in an interview. Eventually, she asked her parents for permission to use an old pair of her shoes. We had a shoemaker in town, and I took those shoes up to him. He removed the heels and put a set of cleats on, she added. Before each game, she also practiced correctly the fundamentals of the game, chasing fly balls, fielding grounders, and acting as warming up catcher. In her senior year, Sands told everyone who would listen that she was going to grow up and play professional baseball. She found that when the high school coach allowed her to practice with the boys' team, they accepted her very well. Her dream finally came true in the fall of 1952, when her father talked to an AAGPBL scout about setting up a meeting with his daughter. The young girl was invited to a tryout, where she passed the test and was rewarded with a contract to play in the league.

Sands was sent to the Rockford Peaches, a team managed by Johnny Rawlings, who taught her the finer points of playing and having fun while doing it. In her two seasons for Rockford, Sands stressed that the girls playing were just doing what we loved and having a ball." Her love of the game was so strong that she moved to right field after learning the position of catcher was filled by perennial All-Star Ruth Richard, whom she backed up as needed. In my two seasons as a pro, I caught just 12 games. The first year I got to play 76 of 110 games. The second year, despite injuries, I got into 60 games. I feel that I learned quite a bit while riding the bench, too, she explained.

Rockford finished fourth in the league with a 51–55 mark in 1953. Further, the Peaches lost to the Grand Rapids Chicks in the first round of the playoffs, two to one games. In 1954 Rockford ended 37–55, out of contention.1954 Rockford Peaches

After her retirement
Following her playing retirement, Sands continued to be involved in baseball in one capacity or another ever since, from Little League coach to women's softball, to keep her love of the game going. She also has been an active collaborator of the AAGPBL Players Association since its foundation in 1987. The association was largely responsible for the opening of a permanent display at the Baseball Hall of Fame and Museum in Cooperstown, New York since November 5, 1988 that honors those who were part of this unique experience. Sands was among the 61 former players who were in Cooperstown for 10 days of filming for the Penny Marshall's film. Notably, the AAGPBL veterans played on Doubleday Field in the final scene scored to Madonna's song This Used to be My Playground.

In 2003, Sands was inducted into her alma mater Bloomsburg High School's Graduates of Distinction Hall of Fame. She also was asked to throw the ceremonial first pitch to the USA Olympic Softball team during the squad's visit to Williamsport in 2007. In addition, she sat on the panel on two Society for American Baseball Research meetings celebrated in 1974 and 1995. I am truly blessed! The good Lord gave me the love of baseball and the talent to play. I had a dream and God intervened and made it possible. Now it's my turn to repay that debt'', she said flatly.

Sands returned to Cooperstown in March 2010, when the Hall of Fame authorities invited her for a celebration of Women's History Month. She is still living in her homeland of Orangeville, Pennsylvania.

Starting in 2012, "Salty" has been the Guest Speaker at several New York State High School Softball Hall of Fame Induction Ceremonies, held in Herkimer, New York (not too far from Cooperstown, New York).

Statistics
Batting 

Fielding

References

All-American Girls Professional Baseball League players
Baseball players from Pennsylvania
People from Columbia County, Pennsylvania
1935 births
Living people
21st-century American women